Cora Richardson-Hodge is an Anguillan politician who is leader of the Anguilla United Front. She has been Leader of the Opposition in the House of Assembly since 3 July 2020.

References 

Year of birth unknown
Living people
Members of the House of Assembly of Anguilla
Anguillan women in politics
Women government ministers of Anguilla
Women opposition leaders
Year of birth missing (living people)